Velhagen & Klasing was a major German publishing company in the nineteenth and twentieth centuries.

History

Long nineteenth century 
 
Velhagen & Klasing's first major success was the popular cookbook of Henriette Davidis from 1844–1875. The company earned 2,762 Thaler in the cookbook's peak sales year in 1858, or the equivalent of  Davidis argued fiercely with the company over her compensation, and her royalty payment increased from 50 to 1000 Thaler over its publication history.

In the 1870s and 1880s, Velhagen & Klasing sold two-thirds of its Lutheran and patriotic works through Colporteur salesmen, at the time a new method of marketing through door-to-door salesmen.

Another area that Velhagen & Klasing emphasized was geography textbooks. In this area, who published 's works, was their major competitor. In the mid-to-late 1800s, Hirt & Sohn and Velhagen & Klasing together had an oligopoly in the German textbook market. 

Velhagen & Klasing was also dominant in popular children's literature.
Their popular novels for girls in this era conveyed largely the same values as their schoolbooks, namely virtue, piety, self-sacrifice, and docility.

In the late nineteenth century, Velhagen & Klasing published a number of very popular adventure novels by S. Wörishöffer. She was hired by Velhagen & Klasing to rewrite an unsuccessful novel by a previously unpublished writer, Max Bischoff, which resulted in Robert des Schiffsjungen (1877). The publisher intentionally hid the identity of Wörishöffer, who was not the world traveling male that the novels implied, in order to preserve their credibility.

In 1886, they began publishing the illustrated family monthly, Velhagen & Klasing's Monatshefte, which included reviews by Carl Hermann Busse.

In 1901, they bought the publishing company of Georg Wilhelm Ferdinand Müller (1806–1875) from his heirs. Müller's work consisted primarily of textbooks.

The publisher had significant involvement in the Leipzig Geographical Society, known as Geographischer Abend.

After World War I 

Velhagen & Klasing rejected this shift and focused on territorial boundaries.
Velhagen & Klasing published the second most popular school atlas in Germany in the 1920s, after the one made by Carl Diercke.
Their atlases in this era were examples of cartographic propaganda intentionally designed to promote German nationalism, as had their other textbooks since the nineteenth century.
The trend to expand the borders of Germany and German cultural influence in Velhagen & Klasing's maps began in the late 1920s, and by 1933 their maps contained large-scale falsifications.

Velhagen & Klasing was one of many who profited from the closure of Jewish and left-wing publishing companies during the Nazi Party's rise to power in the 1930s.

Notes

Citations

References 

 
  ProQuest Revised from

Further reading 

 
 
  ProQuest
 
 
  Adapted from Tabaczek's 2001 dissertation at Universität-Gesamthochschule Essen.

External links 

 Internet Archive books published by Velhagen & Klasing 
 Open Library page

German companies established in 1833
1954 disestablishments in Germany
Atlases
Book publishing companies of Germany
Companies disestablished in 1954
Publishing companies established in 1833